Oliver P. Chandler (May 29, 1807 – September 19, 1895) was a Vermont attorney and politician who served as President of the Vermont Senate.

Biography
Oliver Phelps Chandler was born in Peacham, Vermont on May 29, 1807.  He graduated from Dartmouth College in 1828, studied law, was admitted to the bar, and began a practice in Woodstock. Among the prospective attorneys who studied under his tutelage was Frederick H. Billings.

Chandler was also involved in several business ventures, including serving as President of the Woodstock National Bank.

Initially a Whig, and later a Republican, from 1836 to 1838 Chandler was Windsor County State's Attorney.

Chandler served in the Vermont House of Representatives from 1839 to 1841.

From 1848 to 1852 Chandler served in the Vermont Senate, and was the Senate's President Pro Tem from 1849 to 1851.

Chandler served as a trustee of Norwich University from 1849 to 1853.

He served in the Vermont House again from 1862 to 1863.

Chandler was the Chairman of the Vermont Republican Convention in 1865.

Oliver P. Chandler died in Woodstock on September 19, 1895.  He was buried in Woodstock's River Street Cemetery.

References

1807 births
1895 deaths
Dartmouth College alumni
People from Caledonia County, Vermont
People from Woodstock, Vermont
Vermont lawyers
State's attorneys in Vermont
Vermont Whigs
19th-century American politicians
Vermont Republicans
Members of the Vermont House of Representatives
Vermont state senators
Presidents pro tempore of the Vermont Senate
19th-century American lawyers